Alkon Distillery is one of the oldest enterprises in Russia, producing strong Russian alcohol: vodkas, nastoykas, nalivkas and balsams. The main principle of Alkon official policy is the alcohol production according to the classical technology that came from several centuries ago. It requires the use of natural raw material, without application of food colorants and aromatic substances.

History

The manufactory was founded in 1897 by Ivan Korsakov, aware that native citizens of ancient Novgorod were reputed for great skills in producing excellent vodka, which amused overseas connoisseurs of alcoholic beverages since 13th-15th centuries. Taking advantage of the water quality of Lake Ilmen and other water sources that surround Veliky Novgorod.

"The storehouse" had been successfully producing Russian vodka by the times of the World War I. After that production and selling of vodka to the public was forbidden.

In the year of 1925 the manufactory was again renamed, this time into Novgorod Distillery No.5, and joint with Staraya Russa and Borovichy Distilleries.

During the World War II distillery workers produced bottles with flame liquid for the front line, which Germans named as "Molotov cocktail". Till the beginning of fascist occupation of Novgorod on 19 August 1941, in short period, 70 thousand of bottles have been produced at the distillery which worked 24-hour on three-shift basis.

By the moment of liberation of the city from the fascists the manufactory was seriously destroyed with hostile bombardments. The reconstruction of the destroyed manufactory began in July, 1944; few months later production of 40% ABV vodka in casks began. Famous "front 100 grams" were sent to military units.

The wine storage and wine department with a capacity of 600 thousands of decaliters were opened in 1960.  The range of beverages was more than 60 products (red wines, brandy, liquors) prepared from natural raw material purchased in France and Spain. Wine warehouse was built in 1964, bottling department – in 1966.

In the year of 1992 the manufactory got the status of Public corporation and a new name PLC Alkon. 

In the year of 1996 Alkon together with the Dovgan protected manufacturing company established a special program which helped to effectively protect beverages from counterfeiting. For implementation of this program the distillery mastered the production of new elite vodka assortment under the Dovgan trademark.

Sergey Yurievich Bobryshev has been CEO of Alkon since 2007.  Hi-tech methods of quality control, progressive management, trademark development and positioning are combined with keeping up classical production technologies, the major rule of which is the usage of only natural components.

Production

The majority of operating production lines were projected especially for Alkon. The new high-tech equipment allows to improve constantly the material processing, bottling of product and quality control as well as to protect manufactured goods from counterfeiting.

Alkon has an industrial-engineering laboratory. It is one of the few certified and independent testing laboratories in Novgorod region. Laboratory employees maintain control on all the stages of product manufacturing components.

Brands
 Vodkas: Veliky Novgorod, Novgorodskoe Veche, Alkon, Tysyatskaya, Posadskaya

Awards

Vodkas Veliky Novgorod, Novgorodskoe Veche, Novgorodskaya Osobaya; nastoykas Novgorodskaya Yubilejnaya, Sadko, Lubava, Charodejka; liquor Lada, balsam Drevnerussky were awarded with prizes of international exhibitions Autumn wine fair in Saint Petersburg in 1995 and 1996. In 1996 Alkon was awarded with the prize of MONDE SANS FRONTIERE association (France) - Golden Bunch, for the participation in its program "Vintners. Partnership for the sake of progress".

References

Literature 
 Бобрышев Ю.И., Золотарёв В.В., Ватковский Г.И., Гагарин М.М., Смирнов А.П. История винокурения, продажи питей, акцизной политики Руси и России в археологических находках и документах XII-XIX вв.  — М. : Кругозор-наука, 2004. — p. 160. — .
 Романов С. История русской водки  — М. : Вече, 1998. — p. 448. — .
 Сергиенко Н.Н., Бобрышев Ю.И., Никулин Ю.А., Мазалов Н.В. Смирнов А.П. Русская водка  — М. : Издательство фирмы «Кругозор», 1998. — p. 364. — .
 Новгородский винно-водочный завод. - Историческая справка №477 от 15.07.1992. - Государственный архив Новгородской области.

Food and drink companies established in 1897
Distilleries in Russia
Alcoholic drink companies
Drink companies of Russia
Russian brands
Companies based in Veliky Novgorod
1897 establishments in the Russian Empire